Leptocypris is a genus of cyprinid fish found in Africa. There are currently nine recognized species in this genus.

Species
 Leptocypris crossensis Howes & Teugels, 1989
 Leptocypris guineensis (Daget, 1962)
 Leptocypris konkoureensis Howes & Teugels, 1989
 Leptocypris lujae (Boulenger, 1909)
 Leptocypris modestus Boulenger, 1900
 Leptocypris niloticus (Joannis, 1835) (Nile minnow)
 Leptocypris taiaensis Howes & Teugels, 1989
 Leptocypris weeksii (Boulenger, 1899)
 Leptocypris weynsii (Boulenger, 1899)

References